Thomas Novak may refer to:

 Thomas Novak (engineer) (born 1952), American professor of mining engineering
 Tom Novak, American professor of marketing
Tommy Novak, professional ice hockey player

See also
Tihomir Novak (born 1986), Croatian futsal player